La Borbolla is one of 28 parishes (administrative divisions) in Llanes, a municipality within the province and autonomous community of Asturias, in northern Spain.  It has a population of 155 inhabitants, and its parish church is dedicated to St. Sebastian.

Villages

References

Parishes in Llanes